Future Hearts is the sixth studio album by American rock band All Time Low, released April 3, 2015 by Hopeless Records as the follow-up to Don't Panic (2012). The first single, "Something's Gotta Give" premiered on BBC Radio 1 on January 12, 2015. Every physical copy contains five of twenty collectible "polaroids". Deluxe editions of Future Hearts feature bonus songs, expanded artwork and an alternative cover. This is the last All Time Low album to be released on Hopeless Records.

Future Hearts  debuted at No. 2 on the Billboard 200, selling 75,000 copies in its first week, becoming the band's highest charting and biggest selling week so far. It also debuted at No. 1 in the UK and in the top 10 in Australia and New Zealand album charts. It has received generally positive reviews from critics, who generally praised the new musical direction but criticised the lack of cohesiveness. The album is notable due to the influence of outside songwriters; not a single song on the album was written without help by the band itself.

Background and recording
The band entered the studio on September 26, 2014 with producer John Feldmann.

All Time Low recruited Mark Hoppus and Joel Madden as guest artists.

"It feels like a definite progression. I wouldn’t say it’s an insane departure or anything like that. We haven’t gone completely the other way and tried all kinds of new things. We’ve certainly tried some new things, but I don’t think it’s necessarily going to alienate anyone or push people away that loved the last record. There’s a lot of stuff that’s in line with Don’t Panic, but there’s a lot of stuff that’s a logical next step from it, too."—vocalist/guitarist Alex Gaskarth.

Maria Sherman of Fuse positively compared "Something's Gotta Give" to Yellowcard, stating it recalled that group's "cinematic songwriting, bridges with gang vocals, technical guitar breakdowns—huge rock and roll stuff!", and acknowledged the "classic All Time Low self-deprecating lyricism".

Release
Following a premier on BBC Radio 1, a music video was released for "Something's Gotta Give" on January 12, 2015. In addition it was mentioned that the group's next album, titled Future Hearts, would be released in April. In February, the group went on a co-headlining UK arena tour with You Me at Six. In February and March, the band performed at Soundwave festival in Australia. "Kids in the Dark" was made available for streaming on March 9. A music video was released the follow day. On March 20, the group performed a headlining show at Wembley Arena in London with Neck Deep and Real Friends. On March 23, "Runaways" was premiered via MTV. "Tidal Waves" was released through Fuse a day before the iTunes release. Future Hearts was released on April 3 through Hopeless Records.

In April and May, the band embarked on a headlining US tour with support from Issues, Tonight Alive and State Champs. In July, the group appeared at MTV Fandom Fest, then at Reading and Leeds in the UK in August. On August 25, a music video was released for "Runaways", premiering on Conan O'Brien's website. In October and November, the group embarked on the Back to the Future Hearts Tour in the US with support from Sleeping with Sirens, Neck Deep and One Ok Rock. The band then brought the tour to the UK and Ireland in February 2016, with supporting acts Good Charlotte and Against The Current. A music video was released for "Missing You" on April 5. In June, the group performed at the X Games. In November, the group supported Simple Plan on their tour of Canada.

Reception

Critical response

The album holds a Metacritic score of 74, based on seven reviews, which indicates "generally favorable reviews". On a highly positive analysis, Thomas Nassiff of Absolutepunk.net stated that "All Time Low has accomplished something more rare than a No. 1 single or a platinum album with Future Hearts -- they've reached one of the most unreachable points for a band from their corner of the world, a point of true lasting value." Writing for Exclaim!, Branan Ranjanathan highlighted the "unashamedly formulaic nature" of the record, further explaining that "there are brief moments where the band let loose, and their ability to write far punchier songs becomes apparent, but many tracks on this album — especially towards the second half — are overproduced to the point that even the highlights are overshadowed."

The album was ranked at number 3 in Alternative Presss "10 Essential Records of 2015" list. Mackenzie Hall of Alternative Press wrote the band "spoke of wanting to return to their roots and they certainly delivered on this catchy-as-hell-pop-punk masterpiece." The album was included at number 7 on Rock Sounds top 50 releases of 2015 list. "Something's Gotta Give" was nominated for Best Music Video and Future Hearts was nominated for Album Of The Year at the 2016 Alternative Press Music Awards. "Missing You" was nominated for Best Track at the 2016 Kerrang! Awards.

Commercial performance
Future Hearts debuted at number 2 on the Billboard 200, selling 80,000 total copies in its first week, becoming the band's highest charting and biggest selling week so far. However, with 75,000 traditional album sales, it was the top selling "pure" album that week. Despite the number 1 Billboard 200 album—Furious 7: Original Motion Picture Soundtrack—only selling 58,000 traditional album that week, the 464,000 sales of its single "See You Again" counted towards its 111,000 album consumption units for the chart's revamped metrics. Future Hearts became the band's third number 1 on the Billboard Rock Albums Chart, and also number 1 on the Vinyl Albums chart with 5000 units. In its second week, it dropped to number 34 on the Billboard 200 and number 22 on Top Album Sales.

Future Hearts debuted at number 1 on the UK Albums Chart on April 12, 2015 with over 19,400 first week sales, becoming All Time Low's first ever UK number 1. The album also debuted at number 4 on the Australian Albums Chart and number 7 on the New Zealand Albums Chart. "Something's Gotta Give" debuted at No. 84 on the UK Singles Chart and at No. 2 on the UK Rock Chart. It also debuted at No. 14 on US Hot Rock Songs and No. 21 on the Bubbling Under Hot 100 Singles chart.

Track listing
Writing credits per ASCAP and BMI.

Personnel
All Time Low
 Alex Gaskarth - lead vocals, rhythm guitar
 Jack Barakat - lead guitar, backing vocals
 Zack Merrick - bass guitar, backing vocals
 Rian Dawson - drums, percussion

Production
John Feldmann - production
Neal Avron - mixing (tracks, 2, 4, 11)
Chris Lord-Alge - mixing (tracks 1, 3, 5, 6-10, 12, 13) 
Ted Jensen - mastering

Additional personnel
Mark Hoppus - vocals on "Tidal Waves"
Joel Madden - vocals on "Bail Me Out"

Chart performance

Weekly charts

Year-end charts

Certifications

References
Citations

Sources

External links

Future Hearts at YouTube (streamed copy where licensed)

All Time Low albums
2015 albums
Hopeless Records albums
Albums produced by John Feldmann